The Palestine Brigade of the Royal Flying Corps, and later Royal Air Force, was formed 5 October 1917 in response to General Allenby's request for an air formation for his planned offensive against the Ottoman Empire in Palestine.

Background
Prior to Allenby's appointment as commander of the Egyptian Expeditionary Force, the German and Ottoman air services had enjoyed air superiority in the Levant.  This was because of the superior quantity and quality of German Rumpler and Fokker aircraft in comparison to the British aircraft.  Allenby was an air power enthusiast and he requested that the British War Office increase the number and quality of Flying Corps aircraft at his disposal.

Formation and composition
With an increased number of British aircraft in the Middle East, the Palestine Brigade was formed on 5 October 1917.  It consisted of all Royal Flying Corps operational units based in the Middle East which were east of Suez.  Forming part of Royal Flying Corps Middle East and it was initially commanded by Brigadier-General W G H Salmond who retained command of RFC Middle East.  In December 1917, command of the Palestine Brigade ceased to be held by the commander of RFC Middle East. Brigadier-General A E Borton was appointed Brigade Commander and Salmond, who had been promoted to Major-General, was GOC RFC Middle East.  Although Borton answered directly to Allenby for operational matters, Salmond maintained a keen interest in the activities of the Palestine Brigade.

The Palestine Brigade consisted of the following two wings:
5th (Corps) Wing - tasked with aerial cooperation and direct support to Allenby's ground formations.
40th (Army) Wing - formed at the same time as the Palestine Brigade and tasked with counter-air missions and attacking the Ottoman and German support infrastructure.

In addition, by the summer of 1918 the Brigade also had a balloon company, an aircraft park, an aircraft depot and an engine repair depot.  In August, the Brigade was strengthened by the addition of a single Handley Page 0/400 biplane bomber which had been flown from England.

Actions
The Palestine Brigade saw action throughout the Palestine Campaign, most notably at the Battle of Megiddo when the retreating Ottoman Seventh Army was destroyed on Nablus-Beisan road by aerial attack.

Commanders
The following officers commanded the Palestine Brigade:
5 October 1917 Brigadier-General W G H Salmond
5 November 1917 Brigadier-General W S Brancker
14 December 1917 Brigadier-General A E Borton
28 June 1918 Lieutenant Colonel R Williams
January 1919 - unknown
18 June 1919 Brigadier-General C S Burnett

References

Brigades of the United Kingdom
Royal Flying Corps
Military units and formations of the Royal Air Force in World War I
Military units and formations established in 1917
1917 establishments in British-administered Palestine